Kirabo Namutebi (born 8 February 2005) is a Ugandan swimmer who represented Uganda in the Women's 50m Freestyle Heat at the 2020 Olympic Games in Tokyo. During the 2020 ISF World School Games in France, she led team Uganda to  France.

Early life
Namutebi was born and raised in Kampala the capital city of Uganda.  She attends British School Kampala.  Namutebi is the second born. Her mother, Hadija Namanda, is the former president of the Uganda Volleyball Federation. Tendo began swimming at the age of seven.

Swimming career
She competed in the 2019 FINA World Junior Swimming Championships in the 50 metre freestyle, where she broke the Ugandan national record with a time of 26.98. She placed 38th out of 103 in the qualifying heats and did not advance to the semifinals. 

She represented Uganda at the 2020 Summer Olympics in Tokyo, Japan, where she competed in the 50 metre freestyle and was one of two flag bearers for Uganda in the Parade of Nations.

Honors
She featured at the FINA World Junior Championship in Budapest Hungary 2019, breaking the Uganda National women’s 50m freestyle record.
She also participated in the Africa Junior swimming championship 2019 in Tunisa and won 2 Gold medals and silver. In the Montgomery County Swim League 2019, she was finished 2nd in 50 freestyle and among top 6 in 50 breast stroke and 50 Butterfly in the All stars event that climaxed the league.

In 2013, She was crowned  the USPA swimmer of the year at 8 years as well she scooped USPA Uganda Female swimmer of the year in 2019.

References

External links

2005 births
Living people
Ugandan female freestyle swimmers
Olympic swimmers of Uganda
Swimmers at the 2020 Summer Olympics
21st-century Ugandan women
Swimmers at the 2022 Commonwealth Games
Commonwealth Games competitors for Uganda